A shooter is someone who shoots something.

Shooter or Shoota may also refer to:

People 
 Rod Beck (1968–2007), American baseball pitcher nicknamed "Shooter"
 Shooter Jennings (born 1979), country music singer
 Evan McPherson (born 1999), American football placekicker nicknamed "Shooter"
 Adrian Shooter (1948–2022), British transport executive
 Jim Shooter (born 1952), American writer

Arts, entertainment, and media

Films 
 Shooter (1987 film), American television film
 Shooter (2007 film), feature film directed by Antoine Fuqua and starring Mark Wahlberg
 Shooters (2001 film), British television documentary
 Shooters (2002 film), theatrical film
 The Shooter (1995 film), starring Dolph Lundgren, also known as Hidden Assassin
 The Shooter (1997 film), starring Michael Dudikoff
 The Shooter (2013 film), Danish film

Games 
 Shooter, the person designated to roll the dice in a game of craps
 Shooter, a large toy marble used to hit other marbles
 Shooter game, a subgenre of the action video game genre
 First-person shooter (FPS), a subgenre of the shooter video game genre
 Shoot 'em up, a subgenre of the shooter video game genre
 Third-person shooter (TPS), a subgenre of the shooter video game genre

Music

Groups and musicians
 Shooter (band), a Canadian 1970s rock band
 Shooter (rapper), a rapper from New York
 The Shooters, an American 1980s country band

Songs
 "Shoota" (song), a song by Playboi Carti featuring Lil Uzi Vert
 "Shoota", a song by Dame D.O.L.L.A. from Confirmed
 "Shooter" (song), by Lil Wayne and Robin Thicke

Other uses in arts, entertainment, and media
 Shooter (TV series), a 2016 American television series starring Ryan Phillippe
 Shooter McGavin, a fictional character in the film Happy Gilmore

Other uses 
 Shooter (mixed drink), a mixed alcoholic drink served in a shot glass
 Zouk Mosbeh SC, formerly known as Shooterz Club, a Lebanese multi-sports club
 "Shooter", another name for the multiple lining tool in engraving
 Shooter, or clicker, a colloquialism for remote control
 Catapult Officer, or shooter, a position in the United States Navy air carrier operations
 Shooter, a ball that keeps very low on pitching in cricket

See also 
 Shoot (disambiguation)